Badminton was one of the sports contested at the 2022 Commonwealth Games, held in Birmingham, England. This was the fifteenth staging of badminton at the Commonwealth Games since its inclusion in 1966, and the second staging within England specifically.

The competition took place between 29 July and 8 August 2022, spreaded across six events.

Schedule
The competition schedule is as follows:

Venue
The badminton competition was held at the National Exhibition Centre in Solihull. Five other sports – boxing, netball, para powerlifting, table tennis, and weightlifting – also took place there.

Qualification (mixed team)
All nations were able to enter whoever they wish (up to five men and five women overall) in the singles and doubles events.

In addition, sixteen nations were also entitled to contest the mixed team event; subject to at least four CGF regions being represented and a minimum entry of two men / two women per team, they qualify as follows:
 The host nation.
 The top 14 nations in the BWF World Ranking as of 1 February 2022, excluding the host nation. Their highest-ranked players in each of the five individual rankings are added together to determine the combined ranking.
 One nation not already qualified receives a CGF/BWF Bipartite Invitation.

Note

In contrast to other sports with a qualifying system, all badminton player selections came from their nations' open allocation quotas regardless of mixed team qualification.

Medal summary

Medal table

Medalists

Participating nations
There were 29 participating Commonwealth Games Associations (CGA's) in badminton with a total of 151 (78 men and 73 women) athletes. The number of athletes a nation entered is in parentheses beside the name of the country.

References

External links
 Official website: 2022 Commonwealth Games – Badminton

 
2022
Badminton
Commonwealth Games
2022 Commonwealth Games